Dunoon Pier is a Victorian pier in the Scottish town of Dunoon, Argyll and Bute. Completed in its current form in 1898, and reaching out into the Firth of Clyde, its earliest parts date back to 1835. It is now a Category A listed structure (upgraded from Category B in 2011) and, according to Historic Environment Scotland, the best surviving example of a timber ferry pier in Scotland.

The first pier on the site was made of timber, constructed in 1835. A more substantial structure followed in 1841 after tourism to the town had increased. This second incarnation was destroyed in a storm three years later. It was rebuilt the following year and extended in 1867 by Campbell Douglas.

The pier was purchased in 1868 by James Hunter, of Hafton House, and was "considerably enlarged, with every convenience for passenger and goods traffic". A ferry also ran from the pier to Cloch lighthouse at one stage.

The pier was extended to the current structure between 1896 and 1898. It was shortened to allow the building of a breakwater in 2005, just to the south of the pier. As well as protecting the pier and its architecture from storm surges, a new link span was installed alongside the breakwater. This was to allow the berthing and loading of roll-on/roll-off ferries instead of the side-loading ferries that used to serve the pier. A tender to serve the new link-span between two interested parties, Caledonian MacBrayne and Western Ferries, came to nothing. Prior to June 2011, the pier was in daily use by Caledonian MacBrayne, who ran a regular foot passenger and car-ferry service to Gourock. However, after June 2011, a renewed tendering process produced a passenger-only ferry service (Argyll Ferries, owned by Caledonian MacBrayne) using the breakwater for berthing. On 1 September 2004, during the construction of the breakwater, the cargo vessel Jackie Moon (82 metres in length) ran aground on the breakwater, with six people on board. Since the breakwater became operational in June 2011, Argyll Ferries operate from this docking facility. The Waverley struck the breakwater on 26 June 2009, with some 700 people on board. The pier was partially refurbished by Argyll and Bute Council during 2015. Now containing meeting rooms, it is purely a tourist attraction.

Gallery

See also
List of piers in the United Kingdom

References

External links

1835 establishments in Scotland
Cultural infrastructure completed in 1898
Piers in Scotland
Tourist attractions in Dunoon
Category A listed buildings in Argyll and Bute
Listed buildings in Dunoon